Bakoyannis (or Bakoyiannis) with the female form being Bakoyanni (or Bakoyianni) is a Greek surname. It is the surname of:

 Dora Bakoyannis (born 1954), Greek politician and government minister 
 Kostas Bakoyannis (born 1978), Greek politician and regional governor
 Niki Bakoyianni (born 1968), Greek high-jumper
 Pavlos Bakoyannis (1935-1989), Greek politician and parliamentary leader

Greek-language surnames